The Asylum is a 2000 British horror film written and directed by John Stewart. It starred Ingrid Pitt, Patrick Mower, Robin Askwith and Colin Baker.

Cast
 Steffanie Pitt as Jenny
 Nick Waring as William
 Ingrid Pitt as Isobella
 Patrick Mower as Dr. Adams
 Robin Askwith as Neville
 Colin Baker as Arbuthnot
 Chloë Annett as Rose
 Paul Reynolds as Snape
 Jean Boht as Mrs. Brindle
 Robin Parkinson as Arthur
 Sadie Nine as Mrs Adams 
 Hannah Bridges as Young Jenny
 Antonia Corrigan as Young Rose
 Carolina Giammetta as Tessa
 Denis Huett as Mr. Brindle
 Terence Taplin as Father Matthew

Reception
The film had a mixed reception. While some critics enjoyed the film, calling it "tense" and "worth a watch", while others thought it was weak and that the plot didn't make any sense, saying they "expected more from a 21st century horror film".

References

External links
 

2000 films
2000s English-language films